The 1894 Auburn Tigers football team represented Auburn University in the 1894 college football season. It was the Tigers' third overall season and they competed as an independent. The team was led by head coach Forrest M. Hall, in his first and only year as head coach of the Tigers. They finished with a record of one win and three losses (1–3). While the team had a losing record and outscored their opponents 106–48, the squad has the distinction of achieving the largest win in Auburn history, defeating Georgia Tech 94–0 on November 17.

Schedule

References

Auburn
Auburn Tigers football seasons
Auburn Tigers football